Janeth Shija Simba is a Tanzanian professional footballer who plays as a goalkeeper for Simba Queens and the Tanzania women's national team.

International career 
In 2019, Shija earned a call up to the Tanzania women's under-20 team for the inaugural 2019 COSAFA U-20 Women's Championship. At the end of the competition Tanzania emerged champions after defeating Zambia by 2–1 in the final. She was named in the 2021 COSAFA Women's Championship squad list. She started all five matches during the competition as Tanzania emerged champions for the first time in history.

Honours 
 COSAFA U-20 Women's Championship: 2019
 COSAFA Women's Championship: 2021

References

External links 
 

Year of birth missing (living people)
Living people
Tanzanian women's footballers
Women's association football goalkeepers
Simba S.C. players
Tanzania women's international footballers